Flexanville is a commune in the Yvelines department in the Île-de-France region of north-central France.

River
The commune shares its name with a small river that passes through it, la Flexanville. The Flexanville is a tributary of the Vaucouleurs which in turn empties into the Seine.

Views

See also
Communes of the Yvelines department

References

Communes of Yvelines